The Huaytapallana mountain range (possibly from Quechua wayta wild flower, a little bunch of flowers, pallay to collect, pallana an instrument to collect fruit; collectable, Waytapallana "a place where you collect wild flowers") lies in the Junín Region in the Andes of Peru. It extends between 11°47' and 11°56'S and 75°00' and 75°05'W for about 17 km. The surface area of the zone is 378'40 km2. The range is located in the provinces of Concepción and Huancayo.

In 2011 Huaytapallana was declared an Area of Regional Conservation by Supreme Decrete No. 018-2011-MINAM.

Mountains 
Other mountains are listed below:

 Chuspi or Chuspicocha, 
 Cochas, 
 Yana Ucsha, 
 Putkaqucha,  
 Anchhi,  
 Qalla Qhata,  
 Talwis,  
 Pakaku,  
 Puywan,  
 T'illu, c.  
 Piñaqucha,   
 Marayrasu,  
 Ch'iwan,    
 Kiswar,   
 Kuchilluyuq,   
 Tunshu,

Lakes 
The zone contains six lakes:
Ankap Wachanan (4,707 m amsl)
Qarwaqucha (4,407 m amsl)
Ch'uspiqucha (4,636 m amsl)
Hatunqucha (4,593 m amsl)
Lasu Hunt'ay (4,646 m amsl)
Pumaqucha (4,622 m amsl)

Accessibility 
The Huaytapallana mountain range is about 2 hours drive from the city Huancayo in the Junín Region. It is located 8 hours north-east of Lima.

At the Virgen de las Nieves there are two itineraries after which the ascent to the tip of the Huaytapallana can be completed.

References

External links
 Blog (Spanish)

Mountain ranges of Peru
Mountain ranges of Junín Region
Nature conservation in Peru